Michael Pugh (born 20 July 1953) is a British bobsledder. He competed at the 1980 Winter Olympics and the 1984 Winter Olympics.

References

1953 births
Living people
British male bobsledders
Olympic bobsledders of Great Britain
Bobsledders at the 1980 Winter Olympics
Bobsledders at the 1984 Winter Olympics
People from Trowbridge